François de La Rochefoucauld (8 December 1558 – 14 February 1645) was a French Cardinal and an "important figure in the French Counter Reformation church".

Life
François de La Rochefoucauld was born 8 December 1558, the second of four sons of Charles de La Rochefoucald, Count of Randan, and Fulvie Pico della Mirandola, and the nephew of Jean de La Rochefoucald, abbot of Marmoutier. When François was three years old, his father was killed at the Siege of Rouen and the family returned to the household of Queen Caterina de Medici of France.	

La Rochefoucauld attended the Collége de Marmotier, in Paris and then the Jesuit Collège de Clermont (later renamed Lycée Louis-le-Grand by Louis XIV) in Paris from 1572–1579. In 1569 he was named Vicar general to Cardinal Louis de Lorraine de Guise in the abbey of Tournus.

Bishop
On 29 July 1585 he was appointed bishop of Clermont, though he needed special Papal dispensation for not meeting all the usual canonical criteria. On 27 September 1585, he received the minor orders was ordained a priest, and consecrated bishop on 6 October 1585.

Cardinalate

La Rochefoucauld was elevated to Cardinal in 1607. He was appointed Cardinal-Priest of San Callisto on 1 February 1610 at the age of 51, shortly before moving to the See of Senlis. From September 1618 until 6 February 1632 he was Grand Almoner of France, and during this period was named papal commissioner for the reform of the old religious orders in France on 8 April 1622. He was President of the Royal Council from 1622 until his replacement by Cardinal Armand Richelieu in 1624.

He served as abbot of Sainte-Geneviève between 1619 and 1644. In February 1619, Louis XIII appointed de La Rochefoucauld to Sainte-Geneviève in an effort to mitigate the effects of previous canons. The canons had been lax and Cardinal Rochefoucauld selected Charles Faure to follow out his wishes for reform.

By 1635, La Rochefoucauld had tired of the cardinalate, and perhaps of the politics of the Church at that time, and wished to end his life not as a cardinal but as a simple member of the Jesuits. He communicated his desire to resign the cardinalate and enter the Jesuits to the current General of the Society, Father Muzio Vitelleschi.  Vitelleschi obtained the consent of Cardinal-Nephew Antonio Barberini, but Pope Urban VIII turned down the request.

La Rochefoucauld remained a cardinal until the end of his life at 86 years of age, on 14 February 1645, at his old abbey at Sainte-Geneviève. Father Vitelleschi took the cardinal's Jesuit vows on his deathbed. La Rochefoucauld was buried in a Jesuit habit in the chapel of Saint Jean-Baptiste, but his heart was deposited in the church of a Jesuit college. In his testament, the cardinal had left not only his books but also his heart to the Collège de Clermont.

References

Sources
Review of Cardinal de la Rochefoucauld:Leadership and Reform in the French Church, by Joseph Bergin

External links 
François Cardinal de La Rochefoucauld 
St. Geneviève
History of the Catholic Church from the Renaissance to the French Revolution

1558 births
1645 deaths
Bishops of Clermont
Bishops of Senlis
Counter-Reformation
17th-century French cardinals
Lycée Louis-le-Grand alumni
French Jesuits
16th-century French Roman Catholic bishops